Samson is a 1914 American silent drama film. Harold Lloyd has an uncredited role.

Cast
 J. Warren Kerrigan as Samson
 George Periolat as Manoah, Samson's father
 Lule Warrenton as Wife of Manoah
 Kathleen Kerrigan as Delilah
 Edith Bostwick as Zorah, Samson's wife
 Rose Gibbons as Sister of Zorah
 Cleo Madison as Jamin, the Philistine
 William Worthington as Ladal
 Marion Emmons as A Philistine lad
 Frank Borzage as Bearded Philistine Extra (uncredited)
 Mayme Kelso as Undetermined Role (uncredited)
 Harold Lloyd as Bearded Philistine Extra (uncredited)
 Hal Roach as Bearded Philistine Extra (uncredited)

See also
 Harold Lloyd filmography

References

External links

1914 films
1914 drama films
American black-and-white films
Silent American drama films
Films directed by J. Farrell MacDonald
Films about Samson
1910s American films